Outremont was a provincial electoral district in the city of Montreal in Quebec, Canada. It comprised all of the borough of Outremont and parts of the boroughs of Le Plateau-Mont-Royal (part of Mile End), Côte-des-Neiges–Notre-Dame-de-Grâce (part of Côte-des-Neiges) and a very small part of Ville-Marie.

It was created for the 1966 election from parts of Montréal-Outremont and Westmount–Saint-Georges electoral districts.

In the change from the 2001 to the 2011 electoral map, its territory was unchanged. A by-election took place on December 9, 2013, in which Philippe Couillard, leader of the Quebec Liberal Party, won over 50 percent of votes.

Following the change in the 2017 electoral map, the riding was dissolved into D'Arcy-McGee, Mercier and the new riding of Mont-Royal–Outremont.

Members of the Legislative Assembly / National Assembly

Election results

* Result compared to Action démocratique

References

External links
Information
 Elections Quebec

Election results
 Election results (National Assembly)
 Election results (QuébecPolitique)

Maps
 2011 map (PDF)
 2001 map (Flash)
2001–2011 changes (Flash)
1992–2001 changes (Flash)
 Electoral map of Montreal region
 Quebec electoral map, 2011 

Provincial electoral districts of Montreal
Outremont
Le Plateau-Mont-Royal
Côte-des-Neiges–Notre-Dame-de-Grâce
Ville-Marie, Montreal
Outremont, Quebec